Events in the year 1986 in Greece.

Incumbents
President – Christos Sartzetakis 
Prime Minister of Greece – Andreas Papandreou

Events
13 September – The 6.0  Kalamata earthquake shook the area with a maximum Mercalli intensity of X (Extreme). The shock left 20 dead and caused $5 million in damage.

Births
 3 June – Alexandros Karageorgiou, archer
 9 November – Eleni Andriola, rhythmic gymnast

References

 
Years of the 20th century in Greece
Greece
1980s in Greece
Greece